Michael Singer may refer to:

 Michael Alan Singer, spirituality writer and former CEO of WebMD
 Michael F. Singer (born 1950), American mathematician
 Mike Singer, German pop singer and songwriter